Jaeahn Hwang clan is one of the Korean clans. Their Bon-gwan is in Hwangju County, North Hwanghae Province. According to the research held in 2015, the number of Jaeahn Hwang clan’s member was 3098. Then, he worked as Ijo (이조, 吏曹). After that, he became one of the Gongsin members and became Prince of Jaeahn. ’s descendants founded Jaeahn Hwang clan and made their Bon-gwan Hwangju because Hwangju was a Prince of Jaeahn’s place name.

See also 
 Korean clan names of foreign origin

References

External links 
 

 
Korean clan names of Chinese origin
Hwang clans